The WWC Intercontinental Heavyweight Championship was a title that was defended in the World Wrestling Council in Puerto Rico.

Title history

References

World Wrestling Council championships
Intercontinental professional wrestling championships